Cajetan Anton Freiherr Notthafft von Weißenstein (23 June 1670 - 4 July 1752) was a member of the House of Notthafft in the line named by Wernberg. From 1732 to 1752 he was Prince-Provost of Berchtesgaden in Bavaria.

References 
 Harald Stark: Die Familie Notthafft – auf Spurensuche im Egerland, in Bayern und Schwaben. Weißenstadt 2006,  (German)

Barons of Germany
1670 births
1752 deaths